Mennie is a surname. Notable people with the surname include:

Allan Mennie (born 1935), Australian rules footballer
Donald Mennie (1875–1944), Scottish businessman and amateur photographer
Frank Mennie (1923–1997), Scottish footballer 
Joe Mennie (born 1988), Australian cricketer
John Mennie (1911–1982), Scottish artist 
Vince Mennie (born 1964), Scottish–German footballer